GMC (formerly the General Motors Truck Company (1911–1943), or the GMC Truck & Coach Division (1943–1998)) is a division of American automotive manufacturer General Motors (GM) for trucks and utility vehicles. GMC currently makes SUVs, pickup trucks, vans, and light-duty trucks. In the past, GMC also produced fire trucks, ambulances, heavy-duty trucks, military vehicles, motorhomes, transit buses, and medium duty trucks.

While many of their vehicles are mechanically similar, GMC is positioned as a premium offering to the mainstream Chevrolet brand, and includes the luxury trim Denali. In North America, GMC vehicles are almost always sold alongside Buick (another premium brand) vehicles at multi-brand dealerships.

History 
Roots to the GMC brand can be traced to 1900, when the "Grabowsky Motor Company" was established by brothers Max (1874-1946) and Morris Grabowsky, in Detroit, and renamed Rapid Motor Vehicle Company in 1902 when the brothers moved operations to Pontiac, Michigan. In 1909 William C. Durant gained control of Rapid Motor Vehicle Company and made it a subsidiary of his General Motors Company.

In 1911 General Motors formed the "General Motors Truck Company" and folded Rapid and Reliance Motor Car Company (another early commercial vehicle manufacturer that Durant had acquired in 1908) into it. In 1912 the Rapid and Reliance names were dropped in favor of "GMC". All General Motors truck production was consolidated at the former Rapid Motor Plant 1 in Pontiac, Michigan.

GMC maintained three manufacturing locations in Pontiac, Michigan, Oakland, California, and St. Louis, Missouri.

In 1916, a GMC truck crossed the country from Seattle to New York City in thirty days, and in 1926, a 2-ton GMC truck was driven from New York to San Francisco in five days and 30 minutes. During the First World War, the company provided the Model 16 3/4-ton truck, and modified its production to provide 1-ton troop carriers and aviation support vehicles, and by 1918, more than 90 percent of GMC truck production was for military use. GMTC provided a total of 8512 trucks to the U.S. government during the war years and earned a Distinguished Service Award. During the Second World War, GMC Truck produced 600,000 trucks for use by the United States Armed Forces.

In 1923, GMC trucks were exported to Japan to help recovery and reconstruction as a result of the Great Kantō earthquake, and the company continued to provide vehicles as the transportation infrastructure was rebuilt. Before the earthquake struck, most of Japan's transportation of commerce and people was by wooden carts and government owned railroads, which were severely damaged when the train tracks were twisted beyond use. Autonomous trucks were much more effective at traveling to heavily damaged areas.

In 1925, GM purchased a controlling interest in Yellow Coach, a bus and taxicab manufacturer based in Chicago, Illinois which was founded by John D. Hertz. The company was renamed Yellow Truck & Coach Manufacturing Company (YT&CMC), an affiliated subsidiary of General Motors. All manufacturing operations of General Motors Truck Company were placed under YT&CMC. In 1928 Plant 2 opened and all headquarters staff moved to the administration building at 660 South Boulevard E in Pontiac, MI. In 1943, GM purchased the remaining interest in YT&CMC and renamed it GMC Truck and Coach Division.

In 1981, GMC Truck & Coach Division became part of GM Worldwide Truck & Bus Group.
Bus production ended in May 1987 and the division name was changed from GMC Truck & Coach to GMC Truck Division. The Canadian plant (in London, Ontario) produced buses from 1962 until July 1987. GM withdrew from the bus and coach market because of increased competition in the late 1970s and 1980s. Rights to the RTS model were sold to Transportation Manufacturing Corporation, while Motor Coach Industries of Canada purchased the Classic design. In 1998, GMC's official branding on vehicles was shortened from "GMC Truck" to simply "GMC".

In 1996, GM merged GMC Truck Division with the Pontiac Motor Division in order to "give the combined division a brand image projecting physical power and outdoor activity".  This coincided with many GMC dealerships merging with Pontiac dealerships, allowing a single dealer to offer both trucks and entry-to-mid-level cars, using a similar approach already in use by Chevrolet.

In 2002, GMC celebrated its 100th anniversary and released a book entitled GMC: The First 100 Years, a complete history of the company.

In 2007, GMC introduced the Acadia, a crossover SUV, which was the division's second unibody vehicle (after the Vandura) whose predecessor, the GMT-360 based Envoy, was discontinued with the closure of GM's Moraine, Ohio plant on December 23, 2008.

In 2009, GMC ended production of medium-duty commercial trucks after over 100 years. They became exclusive to Chevrolet with the launch of the 4500HD/5500HD Silverado in 2018. Also in 2009, GMC introduced the Terrain, a mid-size crossover SUV based on the GM Theta platform shared with the Chevrolet Equinox.  It replaced the Pontiac Torrent after the brand's demise.

In 2020, General Motors announced the return of the Hummer nameplate, this time as a sub-brand of GMC instead of a stand-alone division. The Hummer lineup includes two models, an electric pickup truck and SUV, to be sold as the "GMC Hummer EV". According to GM, the Edition 1 production electric pickup truck will feature 1,000 horsepower, hit 60 mph in 3 seconds and is scheduled to launch in late 2021. The new Hummer EV was revealed on October 20, 2020.

In 2022, the GMC brand was introduced in South Korea as a subsidiary of GM Korea.

Platform sharing with Chevrolet
 
Beginning in 1920, GMC and Chevrolet trucks became largely similar, built as variants of the same platform, sharing much the same body sheetwork, except for nameplates and grilles – though their differences, especially engines, have varied over the years. GMC advertising marketed its trucks to commercial buyers and businesses, whereas Chevrolet's advertising was directed towards private owners. Beginning in 1928, GMCs used Pontiac's 186 cu in six-cylinder engines in their lighter trucks. Medium-duty trucks relied on Oldsmobile straight-6 engines, while the heaviest trucks used GMC's own "Standard Big Brute" engine. From 1939 to 1974 GMC had its own line of six-cylinder engines, first the inline sixes known as "Jimmy's" from 1939 to 1959, and then their own V6 from 1960 until 1974, of which a V8 and a V12 version also existed. Additionally, from 1955 through 1959, the less than 2-ton, domestic GMC gasoline trucks were equipped with Pontiac V8s, and Oldsmobile V8s—whereas the Canadian models used Chevrolet engines. GMC dealerships were partnered with Pontiac, Oldsmobile and Buick dealerships.

Between 1962 and 1972, most GMC vehicles were equipped with quad-headlights, while their Chevrolet clones were equipped with dual-headlights. The platform has been the most profitable for General Motors, as it was shared with the Chevrolet Blazer/GMC Jimmy, the Chevrolet Suburban and the Chevrolet Tahoe/GMC Denali. In 1998 the platform was introduced as the Cadillac Escalade.

In 1971, GMC marketed their version of the Chevrolet El Camino, which was based on the Chevrolet Chevelle. Called Sprint, it was virtually identical to the El Camino, and a sport version, the SP, was equivalent to the El Camino SS. It was renamed Caballero in 1978, and remained produced alongside the El Camino until its demise in 1987.

In 1973, with GM's introduction of the new "rounded line" series trucks, GMC and Chevrolet trucks became even more similar, ending production of GMC's quad-headlight models, and setting the standard for the Chevrolet/GMC line of trucks for over thirty years.

, GMC's vehicles are marketed as more premium, luxury vehicles positioned above similar vehicles from the more mainstream Chevrolet division. Chevrolet vehicles are priced lower than a comparable GMC, but GMC vehicles have features not found in a comparable Chevrolet.

In North America, Chevrolet offers a full lineup of cars, crossover vehicles, sport utility vehicles, and pickup trucks. GMC, however, does not offer any car models, so typically they are sold along Buick (or sometimes Cadillac) vehicles at multi-brand dealerships, allowing the same dealer to sell a full lineup of upscale vehicles, including both cars and trucks. However, standalone GMC dealerships do exist, primarily for dealers who have a focus on selling to the commercial and fleet vehicle markets.

Other platform sharing

GMC models

Light-duty trucks

Medium-duty trucks

Heavy-duty trucks

Buses

Vans

SUVs

Motorhomes

Military vehicles

Sedans

See also

 General Motors
 History of General Motors

References

External links

 
 GMC History (GM's website)

 
General Motors marques
Bus manufacturers of the United States
Truck manufacturers of the United States
Vehicle manufacturing companies established in 1911
1911 establishments in Michigan